The Latvijas Radio Amatieru Līga (LRAL) (in English, Latvian Amateur Radio League) is a national non-profit organization for amateur radio enthusiasts in Latvia.  Key membership benefits of LRAL include the sponsorship of amateur radio operating awards and radio contests, and a QSL bureau for those members who regularly communicate with amateur radio operators in other countries. LRAL represents the interests of Latvian amateur radio operators before Latvian, European, and international telecommunications regulatory authorities.  LRAL is the national member society representing Latvia in the International Amateur Radio Union.

See also 
International Amateur Radio Union

References 

Latvia
Organisations based in Latvia
Radio in Latvia
Organisations based in Riga